Katarzyna Doraczyńska (3 October 1978 – 10 April 2010) was a Polish activist.

She died in the 2010 Polish Air Force Tu-154 crash near Smolensk on 10 April 2010. She was posthumously awarded the Order of Polonia Restituta.

References

1978 births
2010 deaths
Law and Justice politicians
Burials at Bródno Cemetery
Knights of the Order of Polonia Restituta
University of Warsaw alumni
Victims of the Smolensk air disaster
Councillors in Warsaw